The 2015 Spelthorne Borough Council election took place on 7 May 2015 to elect all members of Spelthorne Borough Council in England as one of the 2015 local elections, held simultaneously with the General Election.

Results

Counting three intermittent by-elections (resulting in a Conservative gain and hold and a Liberal Democrat hold) and five defections from the governing party group in the 2011-2015 period (Cllrs Budd, D. Grant, Forsbrey, Rough and Sexton) the results saw these net changes:

Ward by ward

References

2015 English local elections
May 2015 events in the United Kingdom
2015
2010s in Surrey